Tino Santoni (1913-1987) was an Italian cinematographer.

Selected filmography
 The First Woman Who Passes (1940)
 Scampolo (1941)
 The Adventuress from the Floor Above (1941)
 Happy Days (1942)
 The Last Wagon (1943)
 The Models of Margutta (1946)
 The Two Orphans (1947)
 Torment (1950)
 The Young Caruso (1951)
 La paura fa 90 (1951)
 The Machine to Kill Bad People (1952)
 Torment of the Past (1952)
 Prisoners of Darkness (1952)
 Giovinezza (1952)
 The Tired Outlaw (1952)
 The Daughter of the Regiment (1953)
 Andalusia Express (1956)
 Estate Violenta (1959)
 Un militare e mezzo (1960)
 The Betrothed (1964)
 Heroes of the West (1964)
 002 Operazione Luna (1965)
 Il vostro super agente Flit (1966)

References

Bibliography
 Christopher Wagstaff. Italian Neorealist Cinema: An Aesthetic Approach. University of Toronto Press, 2007.

External links

1913 births
1987 deaths
Italian cinematographers
Film people from Rome